The Roman Catholic Diocese of Lorena is a diocese located in the city of Lorena, São Paulo, in the Ecclesiastical province of Aparecida in Brazil.

On Tuesday, 18 August 2012, the then-Bishop of Lorena, Bishop Benedito Beni dos Santos, was named by Pope Benedict XVI to serve as one of the papally-appointed Synod Fathers for the October 2012 13th Ordinary General Assembly of the Synod of Bishops on the New Evangelization.

History
31 July 1937: Established as Diocese of Lorena from the Diocese of Taubaté

Leadership

Bishops of Lorena (Roman rite), listed in reverse chronological order
Bishop Joaquim Wladimir Lopes Dias (13 January 2021 – present)
Bishop João Inácio Müller, O.F.M. (25 September 2013 – 15 May 2019); formerly, Minister Provincial for the Franciscans in Rio Grande do Sul, Brazil; appointed Archbishop of Campinas, São Paulo
Bishop Benedito Beni dos Santos (26 April 2006 – 25 September 2013)
Bishop Eduardo Benes de Sales Rodrigues (10 January 2001 – 4 May 2005), appointed Archbishop of Sorocaba, São Paulo)
Bishop João Hipólito de Morais (11 July 1977 – 10 January 2001)
Bishop Antônio Afonso de Miranda, S.D.N. (3 November 1971 – 11 July 1977), appointed Coadjutor Bishop of Campanha, Minas Gerais
Bishop Cândido Rubens Padín, O.S.B. (3 January 1966 – 27 April 1970), appointed Bishop of Bauru, São Paulo
Bishop José Melhado Campos (29 May 1960 – 22 February 1965), appointed Coadjutor Bishop of Sorocaba
Bishop Luís Gonzaga Peluso (13 June 1946 – 25 July 1959), appointed Coadjutor Bishop of Sorocaba
Bishop Francisco do Borja Pereira do Amaral (21 December 1940 – 3 October 1944), appointed Bishop of Taubaté, São Paulo

References
GCatholic.org
Catholic Hierarchy
Diocese website (Portuguese)

Roman Catholic dioceses in Brazil
Lorena, Roman Catholic Diocese of
Christian organizations established in 1937
Roman Catholic dioceses and prelatures established in the 20th century
1937 establishments in Brazil